Squalius prespensis is a species of freshwater fish in the family Cyprinidae, growing to  SL. It was originally described as a subspecies of European chub.

Squalius prespensis is endemic to the Lake Prespa basin, shared between Albania, Greece, and North Macedonia. It is abundant within its restricted habitat, and seems to have increased in abundance in recent years. However, it is potentially threatened by overfishing, water extraction, and pollution.

References

Squalius
Endemic fauna of the Balkans
Freshwater fish of Europe
Fish described in 1977
Taxonomy articles created by Polbot